McMaster House is a historic home located at Bath in Steuben County, New York.  It is a -story, five-bay frame residence built about 1830.  It is a center-hall, vernacular Greek Revival-style farmhouse with a gable roof and brick interior end chimneys.  Also on the property is a -story 19th-century barn.

It was listed on the National Register of Historic Places in 1983.

References

Houses on the National Register of Historic Places in New York (state)
Greek Revival houses in New York (state)
Houses completed in 1830
Houses in Steuben County, New York
1830 establishments in New York (state)
National Register of Historic Places in Steuben County, New York